Luigi Rotelli (26 July 1833 – 15 September 1891) was an Italian prelate of the Catholic Church who was a bishop and a diplomat in the service of the Holy See. He was made a cardinal in June 1891, just weeks before his death.

Biography
Luigi Rotelli (sometimes rendered "Roteili") was born on 26 July 1833 on Corciano in Umbria. He earned a doctorate in theology at the University of Perugia on 19 July 1857; one of his teachers was Giuseppe Pecci, brother of the future Pope Leo XIII, who was then Bishop of Perugia. Rotelli was ordained a priest on 20 December 1856.

In the diocese of Perugia, professor of its seminary, 1857–1878; canon of the cathedral chapter, 16 August 1863; prosynodal examiner, 1870; archdeacon of the cathedral chapter, 15 May 1877.

On 15 July 1878, Pope Leo XIII appointed him bishop of Montefiascone. He received his episcopal consecration on 21 July 1878 from Cardinal Raffaele Monaco La Valletta.

He was transferred to the titular see of Pharsala on 22 December 1882 and on 26 January 1883 named apostolic delegate in Constantinople and apostolic vicar of Constantinople.

He was named Nuncio to France on 23 May 1887.

Pope Leo made him a cardinal of the order of cardinal priests on 1 June 1891. He received his red biretta from French President Sadi Carnot, but was never invested by the pope with the other symbols of his new rank, nor assigned a titular church.

Rotelli died after a brief bout of typhoid fever on 15 September 1891. He was buried Rome's Campo Verano cemetery.

Honors
The Grand Cross of Medjdieh from the Ottoman sultan
The Order of the Lion and the Sun from the Shah of Persia
France awarded him the Grand Cross of the Legion of Honor.

Notes

References

External links
 
 

1833 births
1891 deaths
Apostolic Nuncios to France
Cardinals created by Pope Leo XIII
19th-century Italian Roman Catholic bishops
People from Corciano